A Sertoli cell tumour, also Sertoli cell tumor (US spelling), is a sex cord-gonadal stromal tumor of Sertoli cells. They can occur in the testis or ovary. They are very rare and generally peak between the ages of 35 and 50. They are typically well-differentiated, and may be misdiagnosed as seminomas as they often appear very similar.

A tumor that produces both Sertoli cells and Leydig cells is known as a Sertoli–Leydig cell tumor.

Presentation
In males, Sertoli cell tumours typically present as a testicular mass or firmness, and their presence may be accompanied by gynaecomastia (25%) if they produce oestrogens, or precocious pseudopuberty in young boys, especially if they produce androgens.

Diagnosis

On ultrasound, a Sertoli cell tumour appears as a hypoechoic intratesticular lesion which is usually solitary. However, the large cell subtype might present as multiple and bilateral masses with large areas of calcification. An MRI may also be conducted, but this typically is not definitive.

Microscopy and immunohistochemistry are the only way to give a definitive diagnosis, especially when there is a suspected seminoma.

Treatment
In males, due to the difficulty in identifying the tumour using imaging techniques, an orchiectomy is often performed. The majority of Sertoli cell tumours are benign, so this is sufficient. There is no documented benefit of chemotherapy or radiotherapy.

In non-humans
Sertoli cell tumors are known to occur in other species, including domestic ducks, dogs, and horses.

Additional images

See also 
 Androgen-dependent syndromes
 Leydig cell tumour
 Sertoli–Leydig cell tumour
 Sertoli cell nodule

Notes

External links
 

Gynaecological cancer
Male genital neoplasia
Rare cancers
Endocrine-related cutaneous conditions